Woodstock is a neighborhood located in inner southeast Portland, Oregon, United States.

Woodstock is bounded on the north by Southeast Holgate Boulevard, east by Southeast 45th and Southeast 60th Streets, south by Johnson Creek, and west by Cesar E. Chavez Boulevard (formerly Southeast 39th Avenue). Woodstock borders the neighborhoods of Reed and Eastmoreland on the west, Creston-Kenilworth on the north, Mt. Scott-Arleta and Brentwood-Darlington on the east, and Ardenwald-Johnson Creek on the south.

Geography
Woodstock, located in inner southeast Portland, is bounded on the north by Southeast Holgate Boulevard, east by Southeast 45th and Southeast 60th Streets, south by Johnson Creek, and west by Cesar E. Chavez Boulevard (formerly Southeast 39th Avenue).

History
The Woodstock neighborhood is one of Portland's oldest, first platted in 1889. Many of its oldest houses, some constructed as early as the 1880s, are located in the northern part of the neighborhood. The northeast corner and southern panhandle contain mostly houses built following World War II. Urban infill is spread throughout the neighborhood but is concentrated in its eastern section.

The land now occupied by Woodstock was wilderness until the 1850s. In 1848, Clinton Kelly and his extended family arrived from Kentucky. Kelly, a Methodist minister, and his brothers migrated their families to the Oregon Territory, fleeing the Civil War and taking advantage of offers for free land. The Kelly family sought land suitable for farming. In December 1852, at the age of 21, Archon Kelly (Clinton and Mary's third son) received  of wilderness on a plateau overlooking the underdeveloped area of land that now encompasses the Eastmoreland neighborhood and Reed College. Using current markers, Archon's land was bounded on the north by Southeast Raymond, on the east by Southeast 52nd Avenue, on the south by Duke Street, and on the west by Southeast 42nd Avenue. Archon lived on the farm until he sold it to Clinton for $2,500 in January 1863.

Ownership changed several more times and in 1889 the land was platted for residential development. A group of five men, including trustee James Havely, purchased  of the land for $48,000. They named the subdivision Woodstock after Walter Scott's 1826 novel of the same name (naming residential subdivisions after romantic novels became "en vogue" as family names were used and became more scarce over time; Woodstock is one of several subdivisions in southeast Portland named after Scott's writings). In 1893, Havely built one of Woodstock's first houses, a Queen Anne style residence on Southeast 40th Avenue now designated as a historic landmark. Havely is also credited for arranging to supply the neighborhood with electricity and water.

Description
Business and civic activity is concentrated in Woodstock's Village Center located on Southeast Woodstock Boulevard between Cesar E. Chavez Boulevard (Southeast 39th Avenue) and Southeast 52nd Avenue. 

Churches, the Woodstock Library, and the Woodstock Community Center are interspersed with large and small commercial establishments offering a wide range of consumer goods and services. Single and multi-unit residential surround the Village Center with most multi-unit dwellings located near Woodstock Boulevard. 

Two schools — Woodstock Elementary School and Lewis Elementary School — are within easy walking distance of the Village Center. Reed College is down the hill to the west, two blocks away. 

Ate-Oh-Ate, Bridge City Pizza, Cloud City Ice Cream, Delta Cafe, Dick's Primal Burger, an outpost of Double Mountain Brewery, El Gallo Taqueria, Lutz Tavern, Nudi Noodle Place, Otto's Sausage Kitchen, Portland Fish Market, and Viking Soul Food are all located along Woodstock Blvd. Toast is also in the neighborhood.

References

Works cited

External links

 Woodstock Neighborhood Association
Woodstock Street Tree Inventory Report

 
1889 establishments in Oregon
Neighborhoods in Portland, Oregon
Populated places established in 1889